Stoczniowiec Gdańsk (Stoczniowiec being the Polish for "shipyard") is a name used by some sports teams in Gdańsk, Poland.

Current uses
SKS Stoczniowiec Gdańsk, Polish football team, formed in 1945.
Stoczniowiec Gdańsk, Polish ice hockey team, formed in 1953.

Both teams have also gone by the names Polonia Gdańsk.